Herbert of Selkirk was a 12th-century Tironensian monk, who rose to become 3rd Abbot of Selkirk-Kelso and bishop of Glasgow. While abbot of Selkirk, King David I of Scotland moved Selkirk Abbey to nearby Kelso. He was elected  to the see of Glasgow soon after the death of his Bishop John, and consecrated by Pope Eugenius III at Auxerre on St Bartholomew's Day, 24 August 1147. He died in 1164.

References

Notes

Sources
Dowden, John, The Bishops of Scotland, ed. J. Maitland Thomson, (Glasgow, 1912)
 Cowan, Samuel, The Lord Chancellors of Scotland II vols. Edinburgh 1911.

External links 
Herbert, bishop of Glasgow (d.1164) @ People of Medieval Scotland, 1093–1314

12th-century births
1164 deaths
Lord chancellors of Scotland
Scottish abbots
Bishops of Glasgow
12th-century Scottish Roman Catholic bishops